Five Points Historic District is a national historic district located at Albemarle, Stanly County, North Carolina. The district encompasses six contributing buildings in the central business district of Albemarle.  They were built between about 1905 and 1950 and include notable examples of Early Commercial and Industrial architecture.  Notable buildings include the Service Station-Building (c. 1929, 1940), Anderson Grocery Building (c. 1928), The Model Tailoring Company (1922, c. 1940), Morgan Motor Company Building (1922, 1930s), and Lillian Knitting Mills (1905, 1938, late 1940s).

It was added to the National Register of Historic Places in 2002.

References

Historic districts on the National Register of Historic Places in North Carolina
Buildings and structures in Stanly County, North Carolina
National Register of Historic Places in Stanly County, North Carolina